is a single released by Gackt on June 11, 2003 under Nippon Crown. It peaked at third place on the Oricon weekly chart and charted for seven weeks. The song "Tsuki no Uta" was used as the first ending theme for anime Texhnolyze. It was certified gold by RIAJ.

Track listing

References

2003 singles
Gackt songs
2003 songs
Songs written by Gackt